Port Kembla North is a single-platform intercity train station located in Port Kembla, Australia, on the South Coast railway line's Port Kembla branch. The station serves NSW TrainLink trains traveling south to Port Kembla Station and north to Wollongong and Sydney. The station was one of 23 on the metropolitan rail network to record an average of fewer than one passenger per day in 2014.

History
The wharves, mills and factories that today characterise Port Kembla began to develop in the early part of the 20th century. The railway from the main South Coast line to the new port was completed in July 1916, but the only station, Mount Drummond, was at the northern end. A single-platform station near the Outer Harbour, called Port Kembla, opened in January 1920. A second station for the suburb, called Port Kembla North, opened in March 1936, at the southern boundary of the vast Australian Iron & Steel site – the year after the enterprise was acquired by BHP.

The station has no platform building – save for a small waiting shed and services hut – and is not staffed. Electric multiple unit trains began to service the station from February 1986 and electronic ticketing facilities were activated in 2014.

Platforms and Services

References

External links

Port Kembla North station details Transport for New South Wales

Buildings and structures in Wollongong
Railway stations in Australia opened in 1936
Regional railway stations in New South Wales
Transport in Wollongong